María Cabrera (born 28 August 1972) is an Ecuadorian table tennis player. She competed in the women's singles event at the 1992 Summer Olympics.

References

External links
 

1972 births
Living people
Ecuadorian female table tennis players
Olympic table tennis players of Ecuador
Table tennis players at the 1992 Summer Olympics
Place of birth missing (living people)
21st-century Ecuadorian women